Vernon Phillips Watkins (27 June 1906 – 8 October 1967) was a Welsh poet and translator. He was a close friend of fellow poet Dylan Thomas, who described him as "the most profound and greatly accomplished Welshman writing poems in English".

Early life and studies
Vernon Watkins was born in Maesteg in Glamorgan, and brought up mainly in Swansea. His birth coincided with slight earth tremors; another baby born that night was christened John Earthquake Jones. His parents were William Watkins, a manager for Lloyds Bank in Wind Street, Swansea, and Sarah ("Sally"), daughter of James Phillips and Esther Thomas of Sarnau, Meidrim. James Phillips was a Congregationalist, reputed to know most of the Welsh Bible by heart. Sarah had a love of poetry and literature; her headmistress arranged for her to spend two years as a pupil-teacher in Germany. William Watkins and Sarah Phillips married in 1902, and had three children, Vernon, Marjorie, and Dorothy.

Watkins read fluently by the age of four, and at five announced that he would be a poet, although he did not wish to be published until after his death. He wrote poetry and read widely from eight or nine years of age and was especially fond of the works of John Keats and Shelley. He received his later education at a preparatory school in Sussex, Repton School in Derbyshire, and Magdalene College, Cambridge.

In his early years at Repton, Watkins' quiet, gentle character provoked regular bullying from older boys, though in his last years he attained more popularity as he was able to show capacity in tennis and cricket. After he died, in 1968, the school wrote that he was "perhaps the best poet Repton has had".[7] His headmaster at Repton was Geoffrey Fisher, who became Archbishop of Canterbury. Despite his parents being Nonconformists, Watkins' school experiences influenced him to join the Church of England. He read modern languages at Cambridge, but left before completing his degree.

Career

Dylan Thomas and the Swansea Group
He met Dylan Thomas, who was to be a close friend, in 1935 when Watkins had returned to a job in a bank in Swansea. About once a week Thomas would come to Vernon's parents' house, situated on the very top of the cliffs of the Gower peninsula. Vernon was the only person from whom Thomas took advice when writing poetry and he was invariably the first to read his finished work. They remained lifelong friends, despite Thomas's failure, in the capacity of best man, to turn up to the wedding of Vernon and Gwen in 1944. Thomas used to laugh affectionately at his friend's gossamer-like personality and extreme sensibility. A story is told that one evening in Chelsea, during the war time blackout, they were walking along and Vernon tripped over something and fell to the ground. Thomas looked with a torch to see what the offending object was and to his delight all that they could find was a small, black feather (FitzGibbon 1966). Vernon was godfather to Thomas's son Llewelyn, the others being Richard Hughes and Augustus John. Letters to Vernon Watkins by Thomas was published in 1957. The 1983 book Portrait of a Friend by Watkins' wife Gwen, née Davies, deals with the relationship.

Others in the Swansea Group known as the "Kardomah boys" were the composer Daniel Jenkyn Jones, writer Charles Fisher and the artists Alfred Janes and Mervyn Levy. Vernon wrote the obituary for Dylan Thomas and when he died, Philip Larkin wrote his obituary.

Bletchley Park and marriage
Watkins met Gwen, who came from Harborne, Birmingham, at Bletchley Park, where he worked during the Second World War as a cryptographer, and she, as a member of the WAAF. They were both engaged in breaking the Luftwaffe AuKa tactical codes in Block F (A). Gwen was at first billeted at Stony Stratford but later moved to RAF Church Green at Bletchley. They were both Flight Sergeants and were stationed at Bletchley from June 1942 until May 1945.

They were married at the church of St Bartholomew-the-Great, in London on 2 October 1944. The couple had five children.

Poetry
His ambitions were for his poetry; in critical terms they were not to be fulfilled. On the other hand, he became a major figure for the Anglo-Welsh poetry tradition, and his poems were included in major anthologies. During the war he was for a time associated with the New Apocalyptics group. With his first book Ballad of the Mari Llwyd (1941) accepted by Faber and Faber, he had a publisher with a policy of sticking by their authors. In his case this may be considered to have had an adverse long-term effect on his reputation, in that it is generally thought that he over-published. Of the book, the publisher said:
"Mr Vernon Watkins is a Welsh poet whose work hitherto has appeared only in periodicals and in recent anthologies. The only influence apparent upon his poetry is one he has thoroughly assimilated - that of W. B. Yeats. Otherwise his style differs radically from that of any of his older contemporaries, except for a racial quality which gives it something in common with that of Dylan Thomas. Mr Watkins is undoubtedly a poet with an uncommon sense of rhythm as well as of imagery."

The British Library holds a manuscript draft of the poem with annotations by T. S. Eliot, showing Eliot at work as editor and board member at the publishing house Faber - his "day job" since 1925. The Library also holds the Watkins Papers which include autograph and typewritten poems chiefly from his seven published volumes, but also some unpublished poems. In 2016, another collection of Watkins's draft poems was acquired from the widow of Watkins. 

Watkins wrote poetry for several hours every night and by way of contrast, Caitlin, Dylan Thomas's wife, could not recall her husband staying in even for one night during their whole married life. As well as Yeats Vernon was familiar with T. S. Eliot and Philip Larkin whose affectionate recollection of him can be found in his Required Writing: Miscellaneous Pieces 1955-1982 (2012).  He was awarded a University of Wales honorary Doctorate of Literature in 1966 after retiring from his job at the bank. He was being considered for Poet Laureate at the time of his death.

A poem by Watkins from The Anglo-Welsh Review; the widow mentioned may be Caitlin Thomas.

Death and memorial

Watkins had developed a serious heart condition, which he made light of, insisting on playing his beloved tennis and squash with his usual vigour. He died on 8 October 1967, aged 61, playing tennis in Seattle, where he had gone to teach a course on modern poetry at the University of Washington.

His body was returned to Britain, and was buried in the Gower, at St Mary's Church, Pennard. A small granite memorial to him stands at Hunt's Bay, Gower, on which are inscribed two lines from his poem "Taliesin in Gower": "I have been taught the script of stones, and I know the tongue of the wave."

A portrait of Watkins by his friend Alfred Janes may be seen in the Glynn Vivian Art Gallery, Swansea. A group portrait of the Kardomah Boys by Jeff Phillips was unveiled at Tapestri Arts Centre in Swansea in June 2011. Featured in the painting are Vernon Watkins, John Pritchard, Dylan Thomas, Daniel Jones and Alfred Janes. The picture is based on a BBC Radio Times front cover from October 1949.

In March 2012, in the BBC Radio 3 programme Swansea's Other Poet, Dr Rowan Williams, Archbishop of Canterbury, presented a portrait of Watkins. Williams regards Watkins as "one of the 20th century's most brilliant and distinctive yet unjustly neglected voices".

In October 2014 Swansea Council unveiled a blue plaque for Watkins outside the building on the corner of St Helen's Road and Beach Street in the city, where he spent 38 years working for Lloyds Bank. On 3 November 2014 the "Poem of the Week" in The Guardian was Watkins' "Three Harps".

Most of Watkins's manuscripts are held by the National Library of Wales, Aberystwyth.

His grandson, Marley Watkins, is a professional footballer.

Published works
 The Ballad of the Mari Lwyd and other poems (1941, Faber and Faber)
 The Lamp and the Veil (1945, Faber and Faber)
 The Lady with the Unicorn (1948, Faber and Faber)
 The Death Bell (1954, Faber and Faber)
 The North Sea (1955, New Directions) - verse translation by Watkins from Heinrich Heine
 Cypress and Acacia (1959, New Directions)
 Affinities (1962, New Directions)
 Fidelities (1968,  Faber and Faber)
 Uncollected Poems (1969, Enitharmon Press, limited edition)
 Vernon Watkins Selected Verse Translations with an Essay on the Translation of Poetry (1977)
 The Ballad of the Outer Dark and Other Poems (1979, Enitharmon Press)
 The Breaking of the Wave (1979, Golgonooza Press)
 The Collected Poems of Vernon Watkins (1986) - reprinted as paperback Golgonooza Press, 2000 ands 2005 
 LMNTRE Poems by Vernon Watkins Illustrated by Alan Perry (1999, Ty Llen Publications) - chiefly poems for children
 Taliesin and the Mockers by Vernon Watkins ... images by Glenys Cour (2004, Old Stile Press)
 Vernon Watkins New Selected Poems Edited ... by Richard Ramsbotham (2006, Carcanet) 
 Four Unpublished Poems by Vernon Watkins' in The Anglo-Welsh Review; vol. 22 no. 50, pp 65–69.

References

Further reading
 Rowan Williams, 'Swansea's Other Poet: Vernon Watkins ...', in Welsh Writing in English; 8 (2003)
 B. Keeble, Vernon Watkins  Inspiration as Poetry, Poetry as Inspiration (Temenos Academy, 1997)
 J. Harris, A Bibliographical Guide to Twenty-Four Modern Anglo-Welsh Writers (1994)
 Kathleen Raine, 'Vernon Watkins and the Bardic Tradition', in Defending Ancient Springs (1985)
 G. Watkins, Portrait of a Friend (1983) [republished as Dylan Thomas: Portrait of a Friend, 2005]
 P. Evans, A History of the Thomas Family [privately published and distributed]
 D. Park, Vernon Watkins and the Spring of Vision (1977)
 David Jones Letters to Vernon Watkins (1976)
 R. Mathias, Vernon Watkins (1974)
 G. Watkins, Poet of the Elegiac Muse (1973)
 L. Norris, ed., Vernon Watkins 1906–1967 (1970)
 C. FitzGibbon, The Life of Dylan Thomas (1965)
 Dylan Thomas Letters to Vernon Watkins'' (1957)

External links
Poems by Watkins hosted by Poetry Foundation
Memories of the poet written by a student
Portrait of Vernon Watkins Retrieved : 2011-02-27
 

1906 births
1967 deaths
Anglo-Welsh poets
British poets
Hungarian–English translators
Bletchley Park people
People educated at Repton School
People from Swansea
University of Washington faculty
20th-century translators
20th-century Welsh poets
British male poets
20th-century British male writers
Royal Air Force personnel of World War II
Royal Air Force airmen